Victor Samuel Mamatey (February 2, 1917 - January 18, 2007) was an American professor of history.

Biography 
Mamatey was born in North Braddock, Pennsylvania. His father, Albert Mamatey, was a Slovak immigrant to the United States, active in Slovak immigrant organizations in the United States.

Mamatey spent his childhood years in Bratislava. Subsequently, he earned a diploma from the Comenius University in Bratislava and then completed his undergraduate work at the University of Chicago before earning his Master of Arts from Harvard University.

In 1942, Mamatey enlisted into the United States Army Air Corps and served in the China-India-Burma theatre. After demobilization, Mamatey enrolled at the Sorbonne in Paris where he earned a PhD.

In 1949, Mamatey moved to Tallahassee, Florida, to accept a faculty position with the history department at Florida State University. He was promoted to chairman of the department in 1964. In 1967, he moved to the University of Georgia. At the University of Georgia he assumed the duties of research professor and served for a year in 1972, and 1973 as acting dean of the Franklin College of Arts and Sciences. In 1984 he retired.

A recognized expert in East European history, Mamatey authored, co-authored and edited a number of books and other publications, including The World in the Twentieth Century (Boston, 1962). He won the American Historical Association's George Louis Beer Prize in 1958 for The United States and East Central Europe, and a Guggenheim fellowship.

Mamatey supported the University Library in Bratislava, Slovakia, to which he regularly sent large volumes of books on Slavic studies he had collected. The University Library in Bratislava maintains a Library of Victor S. Mamatey.

Mamatey died in Tallahassee, Florida.

External references 
  Library of Victor S. Mamatey

References

20th-century American historians
American male non-fiction writers
1917 births
2007 deaths
University of Chicago alumni
Harvard University alumni
University of Georgia faculty
American people of Slovak descent
Florida State University faculty
20th-century American male writers
United States Army Air Forces personnel of World War II
American expatriates in Czechoslovakia
American expatriates in France
University of Paris alumni